Blatnica is a village in central Croatia, just southwest of Bjelovar. The population is 130 (census 2011).

The nearby Blatnica fish ponds, created by draining the floodplains of the Česma river, are a major bird habitat with more than 100 recorded bird species, and a part of the Natura 2000 network.

References

Blatnica